Teesri Aankh: The Hidden Camera is a 2006 Indian action-techno thriller film starring Sunny Deol and Amisha Patel, and directed By Harry Baweja. The film's plot is inspired by Michael Powell's controversial cult masterpiece Peeping Tom, however, the story adds traditional Bollywood flair, including a love story and much less provocative themes than Powell's film, mainly based on pornography. The film is also inspired by the 1994 movie Mute Witness. It was a box office failure.

Plot

Sudama Pandey is a notorious criminal who runs a global operation of capturing women on camera. He operates out of London and is assisted by his two partners in crime.

Be it a honeymoon bedroom, changing rooms, girls hostels, none of these places misses the third eye; the eye of a camera. First, they capture girls on film and blackmail them, then abuse them, both physically and mentally.

One such girl who gets trapped by them is Sapna, an air hostess. She is a lovely girl who has dreams of making it big in her career. She found the love of her life through her fiancé, Arjun Singh. Sudama installs hidden cameras in her changing room and blackmails her into doing blue films in exchange for the hidden camera footage he took of her. Sudama does nasty things with her, but gives her the film afterwards. She is murdered by Sudama's gang not long after.

The murder is witnessed by Ammu  who tries to rescue Sapna, but her efforts are in vain. Ammu is traumatized by the events, but soon finds herself in danger as Sudama begins plotting to kill her.

Meanwhile, Ammu's sister Aarti  and her partner Rahul are searching for Sapna after her disappearance. Arjun, who turns out to be an A.C.P. in Mumbai, is also seeking his fiancé's whereabouts, investigating Sudama as he was the last person seen with her. His investigation leads him to London, where the only clue that could give him any answers turns out to be the sole witness – Ammu.

Unfortunately, Ammu herself has gone missing. He makes all possible attempts to find her but reaches a dead end. Without Ammu, he has nowhere else to turn. The race is on to find her and solve the case. But it won't be easy, because Arjun just doesn't have to fight criminals – he also has to fight technology.

Cast

Sunny Deol ... ACP Arjun Singh
Amisha Patel ... Ammu
Neha Dhupia ... Sapna
Mukesh Rishi ... Sudama Pandey
Aarti Chhabria ... Aarti
Aashish Chaudhary ... Rahul
Mukesh Tiwari ... Dinesh 1
Murli Sharma ... Dinesh 2
Ayub Khan... Inspector Vikram
Ravi Kale...Corrupt MLA, Corporator Shinde
Jazzy B ... Himself – song “Chug De Punjabi”

Soundtrack
The songs were composed by Sukhshinder Shinda, Nitz 'N' Sony and Harry Anand.  
One of the songs, "Assi Teri Gul Karni", by Harry Anand, is a straight lift from Pakistani pop singer Abrar Ul Haq's song "Assan Jana Mall-o Mall" from the namesake album.
The Lounge Version of "Sharabiyon" rendered by Asha Bhonsle, Composed by newcomers Nitz 'N' Sony was on the BBC Charts; and is a part of the Platinum Collection of 8 Life Time Best Songs by Asha Bhonsle. The Lyrics of "Sharabiyon" were written by Nitin "Nitz" Arora himself.

Track listing

References

External links

2006 films
2000s Hindi-language films
2006 action thriller films
Indian action thriller films
Films directed by Harry Baweja
Techno-thriller films